Udi is a Local Government Area of Enugu State, Nigeria. Its headquarters is in the town of Udi on the A232 highway. The current Local government chairman is Hon Ifeanyi Agu.
 
It has an area of 897 km and a population of 370,002 at the 2015 census.

The postal code of the area is 401.

It was the subject of the 1949 documentary film Daybreak in Udi.

Cultural and political clans in UDI LGA 

1. Umuneke clan, comprising the following communities: Udi/Agbudu, Abia, Obinagu, Umuabi Ezike, Omashi-Amaji Umuabi, Umuaga, Oji Amokwe, Enugu Amokwe, Etiti Amokwe, Uwani Amokwe and Nachi. Abia is the eldest in family ranking in Umuneke.

2. Ezedike: Akpakwume, Ibute Nze, Ezi Nze, Oghu

3.  Ojebogene: Awhum, Ebe, Abor, Umuavulu, Abor, Ukana, Awhum, Okpatu-Ikeghe, Okpatu-Ibite, Umulumbge, Umuoka.
        
4. Ugwunye: Amaozalla Affa Egede, Affa, Amaozalla Affa, Amafia Affa, Amokwu Affa.
	
5. Ngwo : Ngwo Asaa, Imeama Ngwo Asaa, Ameke Ngwo, Uboji Ngwo, Amankwo Ngwo.

6. Oshie : Nsude, Eke, and Abia

References

Local Government Areas in Enugu State
Cities in Enugu State
Local Government Areas in Igboland